Caper Peak is located in the Lewis Range, Glacier National Park in the U.S. state of Montana. Caper Peak is approximately  NNW of Vigil Peak. Richard T. Evans, USGS topographer who worked on the early map of Glacier Park, named this mountain when he counted over 30 goats "capering" on this peak. (Caper: A leap; a skip or spring, as in dancing or mirth, or in the frolic of a kid or lamb.)

Geology

Like other mountains in Glacier National Park, the peak is composed of sedimentary rock laid down during the Precambrian to Jurassic periods.

Climate
Based on the Köppen climate classification, the peak is located in an alpine subarctic climate zone with long, cold, snowy winters, and cool to warm summers. Temperatures can drop below −10 °F with wind chill factors below −30 °F.

See also
 Mountains and mountain ranges of Glacier National Park (U.S.)

References

External links
 Caper: Wiktionary.org
 Weather: Caper Peak
Mountains of Flathead County, Montana
Caper
Lewis Range
Mountains of Montana